Ahmed Hadid Thuwaini Al-Mukhaini (born 18 July 1984), commonly known as Ahmed Hadid, is a former Omani footballer who last played for Sur SC in Oman Professional League.

Club career

On 13 September 2014, he signed a one-year contract extension with Fanja SC.

Club career statistics

International career

Ahmed was selected for the national team for the first time in 2003, along with Ahmed Mubarak, Badar Al-Maimani and Ali Al-Habsi.

Gulf Cup of Nations
Ahmed has made appearances in the 2003 Gulf Cup of Nations, 2004 Gulf Cup of Nations, the 2007 Gulf Cup of Nations, the 2009 Gulf Cup of Nations, the 2010 Gulf Cup of Nations and the 2013 Gulf Cup of Nations.

AFC Asian Cup Qualification
Ahmed has made appearances in the 2004 AFC Asian Cup qualification, the 2004 AFC Asian Cup, the 2007 AFC Asian Cup qualification, the 2007 AFC Asian Cup and the 2011 AFC Asian Cup qualification.

He scored four goals in the 2004 AFC Asian Cup qualification, a brace in a 7–0 win over Nepal, a goal in a 6–0 win over Nepal and another in a 2–0 win over Vietnam hence helping his team to qualify for the 2004 AFC Asian Cup. In the tournament, Oman won four points in a 2–0 win over Thailand and a 2–2 draw against Iran and hence failed to qualify for the quarter-finals.

FIFA World Cup qualification
Ahmed has made six appearances in the 2006 FIFA World Cup qualification, four in the 2006 FIFA World Cup qualification and seven in the 2014 FIFA World Cup qualification.

His only goal for Oman in FIFA World Cup qualification came in the Second Round of FIFA World Cup qualification in a 7–0 win over Singapore.

National Team career statistics

Goals for Senior National Team
Scores and results list Oman's goal tally first.

Honours

Club
Al-Ittihad
Saudi Professional League (1): 2008–09; Runners-up 2009–10
Saudi Champions Cup (1): 2010; Runners-up 2008, 2011
AFC Champions League (0): Runners-up 2009

El Jaish
Qatar Stars League (0): Runners-up 2011–12
Qatari Stars Cup (2): 2013

With Fanja
Oman Professional League (0): Runner-up 2013–14
Sultan Qaboos Cup (1): 2013–14
Oman Professional League Cup (1): 2014–15
Oman Super Cup (0): Runner-up 2013, 2014

National Team
Gulf Cup of Nations: 2009; Runner-up: 2004, 2007

See also 
 List of men's footballers with 100 or more international caps

References

External links
 
 
 Ahmed Hadid at Goal.com
 
 
 

1984 births
Living people
Omani footballers
Oman international footballers
Omani expatriate footballers
Association football midfielders
2004 AFC Asian Cup players
2007 AFC Asian Cup players
Al-Tali'aa SC players
Al-Shamal SC players
Ittihad FC players
El Jaish SC players
Fanja SC players
sur SC players
Qatar Stars League players
Saudi Professional League players
Oman Professional League players
Expatriate footballers in Qatar
Omani expatriate sportspeople in Qatar
Expatriate footballers in Saudi Arabia
Omani expatriate sportspeople in Saudi Arabia
Footballers at the 2002 Asian Games
Footballers at the 2006 Asian Games
FIFA Century Club
Asian Games competitors for Oman
People from Sur, Oman